New Clee railway station serves the suburb of New Clee, Grimsby in North East Lincolnshire, England. The station originally had two platforms, since reduced to one and is served by trains on the Barton line between Cleethorpes and Barton-Upon-Humber, operated by East Midlands Railway.

The station was opened in 1875 when New Clee was established. The disused platform is still visible opposite the platform that is currently in use.

Service
 
All services at New Clee are operated by East Midlands Railway using Class 156 DMUs.

There is a Sunday service of four trains per day in each direction during the summer months only. There are no winter Sunday services at the station.

Services were previously operated by Northern Trains but transferred to East Midlands Railway as part of the May 2021 timetable changes.

References

External links 

Railway stations in the Borough of North East Lincolnshire
DfT Category F2 stations
Former Great Central Railway stations
Railway stations in Great Britain opened in 1875
Railway stations served by East Midlands Railway
Former Northern franchise railway stations